The Phoenix Museum of History was a history museum located in Phoenix, Arizona's Heritage and Science Park.

The museum opened in the 1920s and its first home was on 10th Avenue and Van Buren where it remained until it moved to the rebranded Heritage & Science Park in 1996 in tandem with the Arizona Science Center thanks to a city bond.
Following financial decline, the museum closed on June 30, 2009.

Following its closure, the museum reached an agreement with the Arizona Science Center to house and showcase their collection.

References

External links

Museums disestablished in 2009
History museums in Arizona
Defunct museums in Arizona
Museums established in the 1920s